Methoxphenidine (methoxydiphenidine, 2-MeO-Diphenidine, MXP) is a dissociative of the diarylethylamine class that has been sold online as a designer drug. Methoxphenidine was first reported in a 1989 patent where it was tested as a treatment for neurotoxic injury. Shortly after the 2013 UK ban on arylcyclohexylamines methoxphenidine and the related compound diphenidine became available on the gray market, where it has been encountered as a powder and in tablet form. Though diphenidine possesses higher affinity for the NMDA receptor, anecdotal reports suggest methoxphenidine has greater oral potency. Of the three isomeric anisyl-substituents methoxphenidine has affinity for the NMDA receptor that is higher than 4-MeO-Diphenidine but lower than 3-MeO-Diphenidine, a structure–activity relationship shared by the arylcyclohexylamines.

Side effects 

Acute methoxphenidine intoxication has been reported to produce confusion, hypertension, and tachycardia that was responsive to treatment with intravenous lorazepam, methoxphenidine has also been associated with three published fatalities and one case of impaired driving.

Psychotic episodes have also been reported, including a murder in June 2014.

Legal status

As of October 2015 MXP is a controlled substance in China.

MXP is also banned in Sweden.

In Canada, MT-45 and its analogues were made Schedule I controlled substances. Possession without legal authority can result in maximum 7 years imprisonment. Further, Health Canada amended the Food and Drug Regulations in May, 2016 to classify MXP as a restricted drug. Only those with a law enforcement agency, person with an exemption permit or institutions with Minister's authorization may possess the drug.

See also 
 AD-1211
 Diphenidine
 Ephenidine
 Fluorolintane
 Lanicemine
 Lefetamine
 NMDA receptor antagonist
 Phencyclidine

References 

Designer drugs
Diarylethylamines
Dissociative drugs
NMDA receptor antagonists
1-Piperidinyl compounds
Phenol ethers